Our Love Is Great (stylized as Our love is great) is the second extended play by South Korean singer-songwriter and record producer Yerin Baek, released on March 18, 2019 under JYP Entertainment. It contains seven tracks mostly written and composed by Baek, and collaborated with Cloud, who also produced her first extended play, FRANK and her first digital single "Bye bye my blue".

Our love is great marked Baek's last work released under JYP Entertainment before officially ending her contract on September 14, 2019 announcing that she will be starting an independent label.

At the 17th Korean Music Awards, Baek was awarded Album of the Year (Grand Prize), Best Pop Album for Our love is great, and Best Pop Song for the single "Maybe It's Not Our Fault".

Background and release 
Following the release of her three-track single "Bye bye my blue" and "Love you on Christmas" in 2016, she was featured on South Korean alternative R&B singer Dean's single "Come Over", recorded "Blooming Memories" as part of the soundtrack for the drama Chicago Typewriter, and focused on live performances.

On March 8, 2019, it was announced that Baek is preparing for a comeback. JYP Entertainment released a teaser photo of Baek holding a flower for the digital mini album Our love is great on March 11, 2019. According to Baek, it took six months to prepare the album. The following day, "Maybe It's Not Our Fault" was revealed to be the title track, and the EP contained "I Don't Know" which was previously released on Baek's personal SoundCloud.

Prior to the release of the EP, the album sampler was released on JYP Entertainment's official YouTube channel. On March 18, 2019, Our love is great and the music video for "Maybe It's Not Our Fault" were released.

Commercial performance 
Upon the release of the EP, the title track "Maybe It's Not Our Fault" achieved all-kill and topped eight major music charts such as Melon, Genie, Bugs!, among others. Other tracks from the album also ranked within the top ten on Bugs! Following the day of the release, Our love is great topped the iTunes album charts in Indonesia, Thailand, Malaysia, Taiwan, Hong Kong, and Kazakhstan.

Track listing

Awards and nominations

Personnel 
Credits from the album's liner notes.

Musicians

 Yerin Baek                                               – vocals, background vocals 
 Cloud                                                        – electric guitar, keyboards, background vocals, bass 
 Jonny                                                        – electric guitar 
 Lee Jung-woo (이정우)                           – bass 
 Kim Chiheon (김치헌)                            – drums 
 Yun Seok-cheol (윤석철)                     – piano 
 d.ear                                                        – strings 

Technical

 Yerin Baek                                                   – recording 
 Cloud                                                        – computer programming, recording, mixing 
 Yasman Maeda                                                 – mastering 
 Shin Jaemin (신재민)                            – mastering

References 
2019 albums

Korean-language EPs